The 1956 United States Senate election in California was held on November 6, 1956. 

Incumbent Republican Thomas Kuchel, who had won a 1954 special election to fill the vacant seat left by Vice President Richard Nixon, was re-elected to a full term in office over Democratic State Senator Richard Richards.

Republican primary

Candidates 
Tilden W. Johnson
Thomas Kuchel, incumbent Senator since 1954
Raymond R. Pritchard
Sam Yorty, former U.S. Representative from Los Angeles and Democratic nominee for Senate in 1954 (cross-filing)

Results

Democratic primary

Candidates 
Thomas Kuchel, incumbent Senator since 1954 (cross-filing)
Richard Richards, State Senator from Los Angeles County
Sam Yorty, former U.S. Representative from Los Angeles and nominee for Senate in 1954

Results

General election

Results

References

1956
California
United States Senate